Clarach Bay is a small bay on the coast of Ceredigion, Wales, to the north of Aberystwyth, where the Afon Clarach flows into the sea. It has given homes to the two main caravan parks of Clarach Bay Holiday Village and Glan Y Mor Leisure Park plus a few smaller ones for holiday makers, the coastal paths runs from Aberystwyth to Borth via Clarach.

External links 
Illustrated description
www.geograph.co.uk : photos of Clarach Bay and surrounding area

Bodies of water of Ceredigion
Beaches of Ceredigion
Seaside resorts in Wales
Bays of Wales